Terrorism in Turkey is a significant issue for Turkish authorities as 1.6 Million people were on trial for terrorism between 2015 and 2022. Prominent figures of the Turkish opposition were accused of an alleged membership of a terrorist group. The definition of terrorism in Turkey is rather vague as it also includes a social media post or taking part in popular protests. Terrorist attacks in Turkey have occurred in the southeastern and eastern provinces, and major cities like Ankara and Istanbul. The group Dev-Genç was founded in 1969 and involved in a string of kidnappings, bombings and bank robberies until martial law was declared in 1971. While these incidents were halted by 1973, attacks by the Armenian groups Armenian Secret Army for the Liberation of Armenia (ASALA) and Justice Commandos of the Armenian Genocide (JCAG) continued. Most of these attacks took place internationally, though there were some attacks within Turkey as well. For example, the May 1977 bombing of the Istanbul airport and the Ankara Esenboğa Airport attack. In Turkey protesting for Kurdish rights or supporting or demanding education in the Kurdish language is often also seen as supporting terrorism of the Kurdistan Workers' Party (PKK).

In addition, involvement in the Syrian Civil War and radical political elements in the country have also been a source for alleged terrorist incidents. Terrorist attacks have had a negative impact on the country's tourism sector.

History
According to Nadir Öcal and Jülide Yildirim, most of the terrorist incidents in Turkey have been concentrated in South Eastern and Eastern Turkey and major cities.

Ottoman Empire 

Several nationalist groups used violence against an Ottoman Empire in apparent decline. One was the Armenian Revolutionary Federation (in Armenian Dashnaktsuthium, or "The Federation"), a revolutionary movement founded in Tiflis (Russian Transcaucasia) in 1890 by Christapor Mikaelian. Many members had been part of Narodnaya Volya or the Hunchakian Revolutionary Party. The group published newsletters, smuggled arms, and hijacked buildings as it sought to bring in European intervention that would force the Ottoman Empire to surrender control of its Armenian territories. On 24 August 1896, 17-year-old Babken Suni led twenty-six members in capturing the Imperial Ottoman Bank in Constantinople. The group backed down on a threat to blow up the bank. On 21 July 1905, a bombing perpetrated by the same group targeting Sultan Abdul Hamid II failed to kill the Sultan, while killing 26 and injuring 58 others.

Republic of Turkey

1970s
Terrorism in Turkey in the 1970s stemmed from the student protest movement in the 1960s. Leftist radicals first attempted to challenge the political regime by use of sit-ins, street demonstrations, and the establishment of a new political party, the Turkish Labor Party (TLP). After only receiving 3% of the popular vote in the 1965 election, and 2.7% four years later, leftist radicals began to turn to a more militant approach. Knowledge on the use of explosives and weapons was provided by the Palestine Liberation Organization (PLO).

Left-wing terrorism began in 1969 when the Proletarian Revolutionaries and Proletarian Socialists formed the Federation of Revolutionary Youth of Turkey (Dev-Genç). Terror activities included bank robberies, bombings and kidnappings (for ransom). In 1971, the military declared martial law to arrest revolutionaries. By 1973, these incidents had stopped.

Two Armenian groups conducted a number of terror attacks aimed at Turkish diplomats, ASALA (Armenian Secret Army for the Liberation of Armenia) and JCAG (Justice Commandos of the Armenian Genocide). These attacks spawned a period of ten years from 1975 to 1985. Their efforts were mostly based overseas, but some attacks occurred in Turkey such as the May 1977 bombing of the Istanbul airport and railway and Ankara Esenboğa airport attack.

According to Turkish professor Sabri Sayari, more than 5,000 people were killed in hundreds of terrorist incidents between 1976 and 1980.

1980s and 1990s
Kurdistan Workers' Party (PKK), a Kurdish separatist group, was responsible for the vast majority of terrorist attacks through 1980s and 1990s. These attacks disproportionately affected the eastern and southeastern regions of Turkey, where the PKK focused its activities. Notable terrorist attacks throughout this period include Pınarcık, Bingöl and Blue Market massacres.

In the 1980s and 1990s, Jihadist terrorism in Turkey was an isolated phenomenon represented by the Turkish Hezbollah and the Great Eastern Islamic Raiders' Front. Since the 2000s, there has been a rise in attacks from Islamist groups, some with links to Al-Qaeda. One group that has been studied by researchers is the Turkish Hezbollah. Some scholars have argued that minimizing the risk posed by Iranian-backed Islamist terrorist groups in the 1990s enabled them to escalate their objectives of destroying the secular regime in Turkey and establishing an Iranian-style theocratic republic. In July 1993, an arson attack took place where extremists set fire to a hotel where a cultural festival was taking place. Islamic groups attacked and threatened Jewish personalities and the Jewish community in Turkey.

The Revolutionary People's Liberation Party/Front (DHKP/C) was established in 1994 following the breakup of the Dev Sol group. The anti-American group, which opposed Turkish membership in NATO and the "Turkish establishment ideology" has been involved in several high-profile attacks against American interests in Turkey, and was still active in 2015.

2000s

The DHKP/C began a campaign of suicide bombings in 2001, combining the tactic with targeted assassination and the use of improvised explosives to attack the Turkish police. The violent campaign intensified in 2003 in response to Turkish support in Operation Iraqi Freedom.

2010s

DHKP/C resumed attacks against Turkish police in 2012 following a nearly decade long hiatus. On March 2015 they took as a hostage a Turkish prosecutor who lost his life in the subsequent shoot out with police. An unsuccessful suicide bombing attempt in April 2015 targeted the Istanbul headquarters of the Turkish police.

The Kurdish group Kongra-Gel, which has been engaged in armed violence since the 1980s, continued its activities in southeastern Turkey and Iraqi Kurdistan. In addition to clashes between the Turkish Armed Forces and KGK in Iraqi Kurdistan, KGK intensified its campaign in Turkey, and was involved in the high-profile kidnapping of a Turkish parliamentary deputy in August 2012. Following the incident the group's leader, Abdullah Öcalan, entered into negotiations with Turkey, where he was in custody at the İmralı prison.

Despite a ceasefire between the government and KGK that remained in place for the duration of peace talks, KGK leaders continued to be frustrated with a lack of constitutional and legal protections. With the exception of some clashes in southeast Turkish over the construction of military outposts that Kurdish supporters view as incompatible with the peace process, the ceasefire held until 2015, when the Turkish government ordered the detention of suspected KGK members in Turkey and renewed attacks against KGK camps and weapon caches in Kurdish Iraq.

In October 2014 Kurds were protesting against both the Turkish authorities and sympathizers of ISIL while Turkish soldiers have been observed to have a "soft stance" towards ISIL militants and even killing a female protester against ISIL.

The March 2016 Ankara bombing killed at least 37 people and injured 125, that attack was claimed by the TAK

The 2016 Atatürk Airport attack, consisting of shootings and suicide bombings, occurred on 28 June 2016 at Atatürk Airport in Istanbul, Turkey. Three ISIL-linked terrorists murdered forty-five people and injured 230.

The Dokumacılar is an Islamic terrorist group composed of about 60 Turkish militants who joined ISIL. The group is responsible for the 2015 Suruç bombing which resulted in 32 deaths.

Other attacks, including the 2017 Istanbul nightclub shooting, were perpetrated by ISIL.

2020s
In February 2020, an Istanbul court acquitted novelist Aslı Erdoğan of charges of terrorist group membership and "undermining national unity". She was one of several staff members of the pro-Kurdish newspaper Özgür Gündem accused of having ties to Kurdish militants.

On 13 November 2022, an explosion took place on İstiklal Avenue in Istanbul's Beyoğlu district at 4:20 PM local time. According to the Governor of Istanbul, Ali Yerlikaya, the bombing left at least six people dead and 81 injured. A woman who left a bag on the avenue is the main suspect in the attack. However, no terrorist group has claimed responsibility for the attack. Interior Minister, Süleyman Soylu formally accused the Kurdistan Workers' Party (PKK) of being behind the attack.

Effects on voting behavior
One study found that Turkish voters are highly sensitive to terrorism and that they blame the government for casualties. Additionally, exposure to terrorism leads to an increase in the vote share of the right-wing parties.

Terrorist incidents

See also
 List of suicide attacks in Turkey

Notes
  The Turkey–PKK conflict is also known as the Kurdish conflict, the Kurdish question, the Kurdish insurgency, the Kurdish rebellion, the Kurdish–Turkish conflict, or PKK-terrorism as well as the latest Kurdish uprising or as a civil war.

References

 
Terrorism in Asia